Henry Brockholst Livingston (November 25, 1757 – March 18, 1823) was an American Revolutionary War officer, a justice of the New York Court of Appeals and eventually an associate justice of the Supreme Court of the United States.

Early life
Livingston was born in New York City in 1757 to Susanna French (d. 1789) and William Livingston (1723–1790).

He graduated with a Bachelor of Arts from the College of New Jersey (now Princeton University) in 1774.

Career
Livingston inherited the family estate in New Jersey, Liberty Hall (the modern-day site of Kean University), and retained it until 1798. During the American Revolutionary War, he was a lieutenant colonel of the New York Line, serving on the staff of General Philip Schuyler from 1775 to 1777 and as an aide-de-camp to then-Major General Benedict Arnold at the Battle of Saratoga. He was a private secretary to John Jay, then the U.S. Minister to Spain from 1779 to 1782. Livingston was briefly imprisoned by the British in New York in 1782.

After the war, Livingston read law and was admitted to the bar in 1783. He was in private practice in New York City from 1783 to 1802. He was an Original Member of the Society of the Cincinnati.

Livingston served as one of three defense attorneys, alongside Alexander Hamilton and Aaron Burr, in the trial of Levi Weeks for the murder of Elma Sands.

Judicial career
From 1802 to 1807, Livingston served as a justice of the Supreme Court of New York, where he authored a famous dissent in the 1805 case of Pierson v. Post.

Two years later, on November 10, 1806, Livingston received a recess appointment to the Supreme Court of the United States from Thomas Jefferson, to a seat vacated by William Paterson. Formally nominated on December 15, 1806 as Jefferson's second nominee, Livingston was confirmed by the United States Senate on December 17, 1806, and was sworn into office on January 20, 1807. He served on the Supreme Court from then until his death in 1823. During his Supreme Court tenure, Livingston's votes and opinions often followed the lead of Chief Justice John Marshall. In that era, Supreme Court justices were required to ride a circuit; in Justice Livingston's case, he presided over cases in New York State.

Virginia-New York Alliance
Prior to his appointment to the U.S. Supreme Court, Livingston served as a judge for the State Supreme Court of New York, a member of the New York State Assembly, and an immensely prominent political activist. Due to family ties, Livingston's allegiance to the Democratic-Republican party soon faded. Essentially, Livingston rebelled and goaded the Federalists to an enormous extent. With members consisting of Aaron Burr, Robert R. Livingston, and Edward Livingston (both cousins of Brockholst), Livingston became one of the few emerging from a compact political faction in New York to form an alliance with Jefferson's supporters in Virginia. This became known as the Virginia-New York alliance, which proved to be vital in Jefferson's 1800–1801 election.

Later years and death
Livingston was elected a member of the American Antiquarian Society in 1814.

Livingston died in Washington, D.C. His remains are interred at Green-Wood Cemetery in Brooklyn, New York.

Family
Livingston's paternal uncles were Robert Livingston (1708–1790), Peter Van Brugh Livingston (1710–1792), Philip Livingston (1716–1778), and his paternal grandparents were Philip Livingston (1686–1749), the 2nd Lord of Livingston Manor, and Catherine Van Brugh, the only child of Albany mayor Pieter Van Brugh (1666–1740).

His sister, Sarah Van Brugh Livingston (1756–1802), married John Jay (1745–1829) who was a diplomat, one of the Founding Fathers of the United States, signatory of the Treaty of Paris, the second governor of New York, and the first chief justice of the United States, in 1774.

Another sister, Susannah Livingston (1748–1840), married John Cleves Symmes (1742–1814), who was a delegate to the Continental Congress from New Jersey, and later a pioneer in the Northwest Territory. Her stepdaughter Anna Symmes, Symmes' daughter from a previous marriage, married eventual president William Henry Harrison, and was the grandmother of President Benjamin Harrison.

Marriages and children
Livingston married three times. He first married Catherine Keteltas (1761–1804), the daughter of Peter Keteltas and Elizabeth Van Zandt, on December 2, 1784. He and Catherine were the parents of:

 Eliza Livingston (1786–1860), who married Jasper Hall Livingston (1780–1835), the son of Philip Philip Livingston (1741–1787)
 Susan French Livingston (1789–1864), who married Benjamin Ledyard (1779–1812).
 Catherine Augusta Livingston (b. c. 1790), who married Archibald McVicker (1785–1849)
 Robert C. Livingston (b. c. 1793)

After his first wife's death in 1804, he married Ann N. Ludlow (1775–1815), the daughter of Gabriel Henry Ludlow and Ann Williams. Together, they were the parents of:

 Carroll Livingston (1805–1867), who married Cornelia Livingston.
 Anson Livingston (1807–1873), who married Anne Greenleaf Livingston (1809–1887), daughter of Henry Walter Livingston (1768–1810)

After his second wife's death in 1815, he married Catherine Seaman (1775–1859), the daughter of Edward Seaman and the widow of Capt. John Kortright. Together, Henry and Catherine were the parents of:

 Jasper Hall Livingston (1815–1900), a twin, who married Matilda Anne Cecila Morris, the youngest daughter of Sir John Morris, 2nd Baronet of Clasemont, in 1851.
 Catherine Louise Livingston (b. 1815–1890), a twin, who married Maurice Power (1811–1870), an Irish MP for County Cork who served as lieutenant governor for St. Lucia.
 Henry Brockholst Livingston (1819–1892), who married Marianna Gribaldo and resided in Italy.

Descendants

Through his daughter Eliza, he was the great-grandfather of Edwin Brockholst Livingston (1852–1929), a historian.

Through his daughter, Susan, he was the grandfather of Henry Brockholst Ledyard (1812–1880) and great-grandfather of Henry Brockholst Ledyard Jr. (1844–1921) and Lewis Cass Ledyard (1851–1932).

Through his daughter, Catherine McVicker, he was the grandfather of Brockholst McVicker (1810–1883) and Archibald McVicker (1816–1904).

Through his daughter, Catherine Power, he was the grandfather of: Brockholst Livingston Power, John Livingston Power, and Alice Livingston Power (who married her cousin, Edwin).

Through his son, Henry, he was the grandfather of Oscar Enrico Federico Livingston (1875–1945).

Through his son Anson, he was the grandfather of Ludlow Livingston (1838–1873), Mary Allen Livingston Harrison (1830–1921) and Ann Ludlow Livingston (1832–1913).

See also

 Demographics of the Supreme Court of the United States
 List of justices of the Supreme Court of the United States
 List of United States Supreme Court justices by time in office
 United States Supreme Court cases during the Marshall Court

References

Sources
 
 "Brockholst Livingston," in Princetonians, 1769-1775 (Princeton, N.J.: Princeton University Press, 1980), 397-407.

Further reading

 
 Bibliography on William Patterson at Supreme Court Historical Society.
 
 
 
 
 
 Warren, Charles. (1928) The Supreme Court in United States History , 2 vols. at Google books.

1757 births
1823 deaths
19th-century American judges
American Presbyterians
Burials at Green-Wood Cemetery
Continental Army officers from New York (state)
Henry Brockholst
Members of the American Antiquarian Society
New York (state) Democratic-Republicans
New York Supreme Court Justices
Military personnel from New York City
Princeton University alumni
United States federal judges appointed by Thomas Jefferson
Justices of the Supreme Court of the United States
United States federal judges admitted to the practice of law by reading law
Lawyers from New York City
People of the Province of New York